Pachnoda fissipunctum is an African scarab beetle in the subfamily Cetoniinae. It was originally described in 1885 as a variety of Pachnoda flavicollis.

References

Cetoniinae
Beetles of Africa
Beetles described in 1885